Route 331, or Highway 331, may refer to:

Australia
 - Myrtle Street

Canada
 Manitoba Provincial Road 331
 Newfoundland and Labrador Route 331
 Nova Scotia Route 331
 Prince Edward Island Route 331

Costa Rica
 National Route 331

Hungary
 Main road 331 (Hungary)

India
 National Highway 331 (India)

Japan
 Japan National Route 331

United States
  U.S. Route 331 (former)
  U.S. Route 331
  Arkansas Highway 331
 Florida:
  Florida State Road 331
  County Road 331A (Levy County, Florida)
  Georgia State Route 331
  Indiana State Road 331
  Kentucky Route 331
  Louisiana Highway 331
  Maryland Route 331
  M-331 (Michigan highway)
  Mississippi Highway 331 (unsigned)
  Montana Secondary Highway 331
  New York State Route 331
  Ohio State Route 331
  Oregon Route 331
  Pennsylvania Route 331
  Puerto Rico Highway 331
  Tennessee State Route 331
 Texas:
  Texas State Highway 331 (former)
  Texas State Highway Spur 331
  Farm to Market Road 331
  Virginia State Route 331
  West Virginia Route 331
  Wyoming Highway 331